Dick Greco Plaza is a HARTline transit center located in the southern end of downtown Tampa across from the Marriott Waterside and the Tampa Convention Center. It was the former terminal station for the TECO Line Streetcar until the opening of the Whiting street station. It still serves as the terminating point for the In-Town Trolley routes. The station opened on January 30, 2003, and cost $3 million to build.

The station was officially dedicated on May 29, 2008, in honor of Dick A. Greco, a former mayor who was instrumental in bringing streetcars back to Tampa after an almost 60-year absence. A statue of Greco sitting on a bench was added just outside.

See also

Light rail in the United States
List of streetcar systems in the United States
Streetcars in North America
Transportation in Florida

References

External links
 Official page

Railway stations in the United States opened in 2003
TECO Line Streetcar System stations
2003 establishments in Florida